is the thirteenth ending theme song from the Japanese anime Kirarin Revolution. The song was released as Kirari Tsukishima's final single, who Kusumi portrays in the show.

Background and release

"Happy Happy Sunday!" is the thirteenth ending theme song to Kirarin Revolution and is performed by Koharu Kusumi from Morning Musume, who voices the main character, Kirari Tsukishima. The song expresses the feelings of a girl before her first date.

The single was released on February 4, 2009 under the Zetima label. "Hatten Joy" was included as a B-side and is also performed by Kusumi under her character's name. The limited edition featured an alternate cover and came with an exclusive Kirarin Revolution: Kuru Kira Idol Days trading card.

A video single, referred as a "Single V", was released on February 11, 2009.

Music video

The music video was directed by Toshiyuki Suzuki and features Kusumi dressed up as her character, Kirari Tsukishima. A key feature in the video's art direction and choreography is Kusumi pulling out a cape from the wings of her costume after the instrumental break.

Reception

The CD single debuted at #9 in the Oricon Weekly Singles Chart and charted for 6 weeks. The video single charted at #30 on the Oricon Weekly DVD Charts and charted for 2 weeks.

Pirosue at Real Sound ranked "Happy Happy Sunday!" at #57 on the list of "Best Hello! Project Songs in the Past 20 Years."

Track listing

Single

DVD single

Charts

Single

DVD single

References

External links 
 Happy Happy Sunday
 Happy Happy Sunday Single V

Zetima Records singles
Children's television theme songs
2009 singles
Kirarin Revolution
Songs written by Kenichi Maeyamada
2009 songs